The Park Street District is a historic district encompassing a small cluster of historic properties on or near Park Street in the heart of Boston, Massachusetts.  The district covers an entire city block delineated by Park Street, Beacon Street, School Street, and Tremont Street, just east of the Boston Common.  The district reflects an early design of the area by architect Charles Bulfinch, although only a few buildings from his period survive.

The Amory–Ticknor House (1804), Chester Harding House (1808), Boston Athenæum (1847), Congregational Library & Archives (1898), Park Street Church (1807), Granary Burying Ground (1660) and Suffolk University Law School (1999) are all within the district.  The district was added to the National Register of Historic Places in 1974.

See also 
 National Register of Historic Places listings in northern Boston, Massachusetts

References

Images

Beacon Hill, Boston
Historic districts in Suffolk County, Massachusetts
National Register of Historic Places in Boston
Historic districts on the National Register of Historic Places in Massachusetts